La Selle-Guerchaise (Gallo: La Cèll-Gèrcheizz) is a commune in the Ille-et-Vilaine department in Brittany in northwestern France.

Population
Inhabitants of La Selle-Guerchaise are called Sellais in French.

See also
 Communes of the Ille-et-Vilaine department

References

External links

Mayors of Ille-et-Vilaine Association 

Communes of Ille-et-Vilaine